Avilya may refer to:
Avilya, alternative name of Əvilə, a village in Lerik District of Azerbaijan
Avilya, a diminutive of the Russian male first name Avel